Gail Ruth Rebuck, Baroness Rebuck  (born 10 February 1952) is a British publisher and chair of the international book publishing group Penguin Random House's British operations.

She sits in the House of Lords as a Labour member.

Early life and education
Rebuck's Latvian-born Jewish grandfather, and her own father, were both in the London rag trade. Her mother was a Dutch Jew. At the age of four she was sent to the Lycée Français Charles de Gaulle, London, where she learned to read and write in French before she did in English. She graduated with a degree in intellectual history from Sussex University in 1974.

Career
Rebuck worked for several independent publishers and ran a paperback imprint for Hamlyn before putting her own funds into a new imprint, Century. After a merger with Hutchinson in 1985, Century Hutchinson was taken over by Random House UK in 1989. Rebuck was appointed chair and chief executive of Random House UK in 1991.

Rebuck was fifth in a 2006 Observer list of the top people in the British books industry, and at ninth place in a 2011 Guardian version of the list.

In February 2013, she was assessed as the tenth most powerful woman in the UK by Woman's Hour on BBC Radio 4. She was recognized as one of the BBC's 100 women of 2013.

In February 2015, Rebuck succeeded Sir Neil Cossons as pro-provost and chair of council (the governing body) at the Royal College of Art; she joined the RCA council in 1999.

Marriage
She was married to Philip Gould, until his death in November 2011. They had two daughters, Georgia Gould who currently serves as leader of the Camden London Borough Council, and Grace Gould.

Honours
Rebuck was appointed a Commander of the Order of the British Empire (CBE) in the 2000 New Year Honours, and promoted to Dame Commander of the same Order (DBE) in the 2009 Birthday Honours.

In 2014, it was announced that Rebuck was to become a Labour peer in the House of Lords, following in the footsteps of her late husband. She was created a life peer on 18 September 2014, taking the title Baroness Rebuck, of Bloomsbury in the London Borough of Camden.

References

1952 births
Living people
Place of birth missing (living people)
Publishers (people) from London
British Ashkenazi Jews
English Jews
English people of Latvian-Jewish descent
English people of Dutch-Jewish descent
People educated at Lycée Français Charles de Gaulle
Alumni of the University of Sussex
BBC 100 Women
Commanders of the Order of the British Empire
Dames Commander of the Order of the British Empire
Labour Party (UK) life peers
Life peeresses created by Elizabeth II
Spouses of life peers
Jewish British politicians
20th-century British businesspeople
21st-century British businesspeople